Avanur  is a village in Thrissur district in the state of Kerala, India.
Avanur is located around 3 km east of the Thrissur-Kunnamkulam highway from Mundur junction and around 8 to 9 km from Thrissur town. The new Government Medical College at Mulankunnathukavu is just 3.5 km from Avanur. Avanur Grama panchayath won the Swaraj Trophy for the best village panchayat in Kerala for the year 2000–2001. The award was given in recognition of the successful implementation of developmental programmes and efficient administration. Avanur is well-connected by around 20 private buses plying through it to various places like Thrissur town, Mundur, Kunnamkulam, Chavakkad, Mundathikode, Medical College and Athani. The newly proposed a combined Medical University by Government of Kerala is being planned around the Thrissur Medical College sprawling across a lush green campus. This is planned to host universities for Evidence Based Medicine, Ayurveda, Homoeopathy, Siddha and Yunani systems of medicine.

Thaipooyam festival
The festival of Thaipooyam during the Malayalam month of Makaram is famous at Avanur - the main event being held at the Avanur Althara junction as well as at the Anthiringa Subrahmaniaswamy Temple at Edakkulam, Thangalur. The festival involves performances with large flowerpots or 'Kaavadi' along with other performing arts like Panchavadyam, Sinkarimelam etc. The kaavadi or flowerpots are made separately by 4 or 5 local groups participating in the festival and taken as a procession to the temple. The kaavadi is basically of 2 types - the 'pookavadi' - the more colourful one and the 'ambalakavadi' - the tall one which is mostly in sets of 5 or 7 made of lightweight wood, ornamentation and peacock feathers. For the Avanur group participating in the festival, it begins with a procession starting from the Avanur Sree Krishna Temple early morning and lasts till noon. Towards evening, it starts again and ends at the Anthiringa Subrahmaniaswamy Temple with the 'abhishekam'.

ACTA (Avanoor Cultural and Theatre Academy).

ACTA is a group of theatre artists, situated in Avanoor. ACTA was established in 2008 as a centre for drama and other creative artists in Avanoor.    ACTA conducts many Workshops for children. Performs Theatre Sketches as well as Dramas in many places. A number of peoples are associated with ACTA with the leadership of Sunilkumar.V.K, Santhosh Sarika, Jayan Avanoor, Vidyasankar Avanoor, Shibu Sarika, Adarsh.P.R and Binod Manithara.

Important places and landmarks

1. Avanur Sree Krishna Swamy temple - a small and beautiful temple located at the heart of Avanur village. Sri Krishna is the main deity here along with Ganapathy and Ayyappa
2. Kanteshwaram Shiva temple - Here Shiva is the main deity. Thiruvathira is the main festival associated with this temple during the Malayalam month of Dhanu.
3. Althara junction - an important place at Avanur where most of the festivities and public functions take place. This Y-junction is connected by roads from Mundur, Mundathikode and Velappaya (to Thrissur)
4. Santha Higher Secondary School - located in between the Asanpadi and the Althara bus stops, this is a Government-aided higher secondary school run by a private management. The school has a very good student strength.
5. Oceanus Palms, a residential villa project of Oceanus group, has started off their work near the Avanur-Mundur road.
6. All India Radio station at Thrissur is located at Avanur - Varadiyam road.
7. Catholic Syrian Bank Avanur branch located at Avanur Althara junction.
8. A number of construction-related industries like hollow bricks, readymix concrete, decorative tiles, wiring cables, pipes etc. are located here.
9. Anupama, a cinema theatre is also located at Avanur.
10. St. Sebastian church
11. Ayurvedic dispensary.
12. Veterinary Hospital 
13. Avanoor panchayath also covers varadiam place.
14. Varadiyam center marked by lijo jose varadiyam.
15. Varadiyam school, high secondary also working same place.
16. St. Antony's church, and Sree ayappankavu temple in same place (varadiyam)
17. Varadiyam place mundur junction to 1.5 km.
18. Varadiyam centre old rice mill working since 1950 with the operator jose varadiyam.
19. Prathibha Library and Reading Room.
20. LIBERTY ARTS AND SPORTS CLUB, ALTHARA, AVANOOR
21. Thyppooyaghosha committee Office, Althara, Junction, Avanoor
22. Geeyes beltings (conveyors). office, asanpady.
23. D S Electrical engineering works Asanpady. PH: 9745374884
24. THAPOVAN junction AVANOOR
25. AMBEDKAR Gramam Part of AVANOOR
26.Avanoor Panchayath President 2020---Smt.Thankamani Shankunny

Demographics
 India census, Avanur had a population of 5732 with 2740 males and 2992 females.

References

2. 

Villages in Thrissur district